Jordan Knight Performs New Kids on the Block: The Remix Album is the second solo album released by singer Jordan Knight. Released in 2004, the album contains modern-day produced covers of songs from his band New Kids on the Block.

In 2007, the first disc was re-issued alone as Jordan Knight Sings NKOTB.

Track listing

Disc 1
 "Step by Step" (Maurice Starr) 3:30
 "Baby, I Believe In You" (Maurice Starr) 4:03
 "Please Don't Go Girl" (Maurice Starr) 4:06
 "Hangin' Tough" (Maurice Starr) 4:03
 "If You Go Away" (John Bettis; T. Lorenz; Walter Afanasieff) 5:31
 "My Favorite  Girl" (Danny Wood; Donnie Wahlberg; Jordan Knight; Maurice Starr) 3:49
 "You Got It (The Right Stuff)" (Maurice Starr) 3:55
 "I'll Be Loving You (Forever)"(Maurice Starr) 4:05
 "Let's Try It Again" (Maurice Starr) 3:44
 "Cover Girl" (Maurice Starr) 3:23
 "This One's for the Children" (Maurice Starr) 3:39
 "Didn't I (Blow Your Mind)" (Thom Bell;William "Poogie" Hart) 3:42
 "Valentine Girl" (Maurice Starr) 3:53
 "Tonight" (Al Lancellotti; Maurice Starr) 4:07
 "I'll Be Your Everything" [Original Demo] (Danny Wood; Jordan Knight; Tommy Page) 4:24

Disc 2
 You Got It (The Right Stuff) [European Remix] 3:23
 Hangin' Tough [European Remix] 3:13
 This One's For The Children [European Remix] 3:51
 If You Go Away [European Remix] 4:32
 Didn't I (Blow Your Mind) [European Remix] 3:47
 Step By Step [European Remix] 4:02
 Baby, I Believe In You [European Remix] 3:26
 Valentine Girl [European Remix] 4:43
 My Favorite Girl [European Remix] 4:06
 I'll Be Loving You (Forever) [European Remix] 4:19
 Tonight [European Remix] 2:54
 Let's Try It Again [European Remix] 3:44
 Cover Girl [European Remix] 3:26
 Please Don't Go Girl [European Remix] 4:10
 I'll Be Your Everything [European Remix] 4:37
 Cover Girl [Additional Mix] 3:58
 Tonight [Additional Mix] 3:16
 I'll Be Loving You (Forever) [Additional Mix] 4:13
 Step By Step [Additional Mix] 3:45

References

Jordan Knight albums
Covers albums
2004 remix albums
2004 albums